Lackenberg is a mountain of the Bavarian Forest and Bohemian Forest, on the border between Germany and the Czech Republic.

Mountains of Bavaria
Bohemian Forest
Mountains of the Bavarian Forest